"Mute" is an episode of the American television anthology series The Twilight Zone. It was written by Richard Matheson, based on his 1962 short story of the same name. The episode deals with a young girl (in the Matheson story it was a boy) raised to communicate only through telepathy, and her struggles after the sudden death of her parents forces her to enter mainstream society.

Opening narration

Plot
Firefighters respond to a blazing fire in a family home. The fire is so massive that they immediately write off the house as a loss, and a search of the building turns up no survivors. However, twelve-year-old Ilse Nielsen is found outside, having escaped unscathed from the blaze that killed her parents. Sheriff Harry Wheeler and his wife Cora take Ilse in until her relatives can be found. Ilse does not speak, even though medical examinations show she does not have a speech disorder. The Wheelers deduce that her parents prohibited her from talking, and they conclude it was a case of parental neglect. In actuality, Ilse's parents were part of a secret society who learned how to use the latent telepathic abilities possessed by all humans. They agreed to raise their children to communicate solely with telepathy. Ilse was two when the agreement began. The members of the society stayed in touch through the mail.

Using the return addresses from the recent society letters, which the sheriff could not open, Harry writes inquiries about Ilse's relatives. Ilse now lives in a world of people who speak with voices instead of their minds. Having been taught to communicate in pure meaning instead of words, she finds the sound of human speech alien and painful. She looks forward to being reunited with the other telepathic children after Harry finds them. But Cora, still grieving over her own long-dead daughter, does not want Ilse to leave, so she takes the letters from the mailbox and burns them to prevent Ilse from being taken away. Ilse witnesses this sabotage but, lacking the ability to speak or write, cannot tell Harry.

When weeks go by without reply to his letters, Harry enrolls Ilse in school. Her teacher is patient with her inability to speak, but firm, and daily prompts Ilse to say her name. She deduces that Ilse has telepathic abilities by the end of her first day. Without telling them why, she has the other students think Ilse's name in unison, thus teaching her speech through her telepathy.

Karl and Frau Maria Werner, society members from Austria, are alarmed by the lapse in the Nielsens' regular communications and come to check on them. After being informed of the situation, the Werners meet with Ilse and talk to her telepathically. Their telepathic speech is incomprehensible to Ilse, and after continued telepathic prodding she begins sobbing and repeatedly saying, "My name is Ilse! My name is Ilse!" The Werners realize that over her weeks in a non-telepathic society, she has lost all knowledge of how to communicate telepathically. They decide to allow the Wheelers to adopt Ilse, even though the Werners are her legal godparents. Though saddened by Ilse's loss of telepathy, they take comfort in telling themselves that Cora Wheeler loves Ilse more than her parents did. The Werners reveal that Ilse escaped the fire because her parents, though trapped themselves, telepathically guided their daughter from the house.

Closing narration

Cast
Ann Jillian as Ilse Nielsen
Claudia Bryar as Frau Nielsen
Robert Boon as Holger Nielsen
Frank Overton as Harry Wheeler
Barbara Baxley as Cora Wheeler
Irene Dailey as Miss Frank
Oscar Beregi, Jr. as Professor Karl Werner
Percy Helton as Tom Poulter
Éva Szörényi as Frau Maria Werner (credited as Eva Soreny)
William Challee as Man
Bill Erwin as Man In Flashback

References
DeVoe, Bill. (2008). Trivia from The Twilight Zone. Albany, GA: Bear Manor Media. 
Grams, Martin. (2008). The Twilight Zone: Unlocking the Door to a Television Classic. Churchville, MD: OTR Publishing.

External links

1963 American television episodes
Adaptations of works by Richard Matheson
Television episodes written by Richard Matheson
Television shows based on short fiction
The Twilight Zone (1959 TV series season 4) episodes
Fiction set in 1953
Fiction set in 1963
Television episodes set in Germany
Television episodes set in Pennsylvania